Emily Deschenes (born December 25, 2002) is a Canadian curler from Ottawa, Ontario.

Career
Deschenes skipped her rink to silver at the 2019 Canadian U18 Curling Championships in Sherwood Park, Alberta.

Deschenes was selected to represent Canada in the 2020 Winter Youth Olympics in Lausanne, Switzerland. The rink, skipped by Nathan Young, went undefeated in the round robin, before falling to Japan in the quarter finals. Following the mixed competition, Deschenes competed in Mixed Doubles with Oriol Gasto (Spain).

Deschenes capped the 2020 season with a victory at the 2020 Ontario Winter Games.

Deschenes entered the 2020–21 season with a new rink. In just their second event together, they defeated the Jennifer Jones rink 6–4 in a round robin game and finished third for the event.

With a new look team heading into the 2021–22 season, Deschenes and her rink captured silver at the 2022 Canadian Junior Curling Championships, losing to Taylour Stevens of Nova Scotia. With Stevens aging out of junior curling, Deschenes joined the Halifax rink of Lauren Ferguson, Alison Umlah, and Cate Fitzgerald as the skip of Team Canada at the World Junior-B Curling Championships attempting to qualify Canada for the 2023 World Junior Curling Championships.

The 2022–23 season saw Deschenes skip two teams, one in Ontario and one in Nova Scotia, as she prepared to qualify Team Canada for the 2023 World Junior Curling Championships. The Nova Scotia rink finished third in their first event together at the U25 NextGen Classic. Deschenes entered the 2022 PointsBet Invitational as the 15th seed where she took Kaitlyn Lawes to the 10th end, falling 10-8 in the Sweep 16.

Deschenes's Nova Scotia rink went undefeated at World Junior-B Curling Championships in Lohja, Finland, beating Scotland 5-4 to take home gold. The first place finish qualified Canada for the 2023 World Junior Curling Championships in Fussen, Germany.

Personal life
As of 2022, Deschenes was studying Business Administration at Algonquin College.

Teams

References 

2002 births
Living people
Canadian women curlers
Curlers from Ottawa